Jetz International Ltd v Orams Marine Ltd [1999] DCR 831 is a cited case in New Zealand confirming that the consumer protections under the Consumer Guarantees Act cover consumer goods owned even if they are owned by a limited liability company, as long as they are used for consumer purposes.

Background
Jetz was a holding company for the ownership of a launch, and rented a berth at a dry stack marina run by Orams Marine.

Problems arose when a former employee broke into the marina, used the gantry crane to retrieve the launch, and took it for a joyride, during which the launch suffered considerable damage.

Afterwards, Orams refused to reimburse Jetz for the damage, relying on liability exclusion clause in clause 21 of the rental agreement.

Jetz sued for the damage under the Consumer Guarantees Act, as if covered by the Act, such exclusion clauses are not valid.

Held
The Court ruled that the launch was consumer goods, for consumer purposes, meaning that the exclusion clause was not legally valid, and awarded damages of $18,000.

References

Court of Appeal of New Zealand cases
New Zealand contract case law
1999 in New Zealand law
1999 in case law